WOW Worship: Purple is the seventh Wow Worship album in the WOW series and was released on March 2, 2010.  The 30-track double CD release debuted in sixth position on the Billboard Christian albums chart, and peaked at No. 3.

Track listing

Charts

References 

2010 compilation albums
WOW series albums